This is a list of various names the Potawatomi have been recorded.

Endonyms

Neshnabé
Neshnabé (without syncope: Eneshenabé), a cognate of Ojibwe Anishinaabe, meaning "Original People."  The plural is  Neshnabék.

Bodéwadmi
Bodéwadmi (without syncope: Bodéwademi), a cognate of  Ojibwe "Boodewaadamii".  It means "those who keep/tend the hearth-fire", which in this case refers to the hearth of the Council of Three Fires.  The word itself comes from "to keep/tend the hearth-fire", which is "bodewadm" (without syncope: "bodewadem"; Ojibwe "boodawaadam").  The plural is Bodéwadmik.

 Oupouteouatamik – Jesuit Relations: 1658, 21, 1858.
 Patawatimes – Treaty of Greenville (1795) quoted by Harris, Tour, 249, 1805.
 Patawattamies – Turkey Creek treaty (1836) in U. S. Ind. Treaties, 648,1837.
 Patawattomies – Hunter, Captivity, 14, 1823.
 Pattawatamies – Hamtramck (1790) in Am. St. Papers, Ind. Aff., I, 87, 1832.
 Patawatima – Treaty of Fort Harmar (1789), ibid., 6.
 Pattawatimees – Jones, Ojebway Inds., 238, 1861.
 Pattawatimy – De Butts (1795) in Am. St. Papers, Ind. Aff., I, 565, 1832.
 Pattawatomie – Washington treaty (1868) in U. S. Ind. Treat., 691, 1873.
 Pattattamees – Wilkinson (1791) quoted by Rupp, W. Penn., app., 236, 1846.
 Pattawattomies – Hunter, Narr., 192, 1823.
 Pattawattomis – Heckewelder quoted by Barton, New Views, app., 3, 1798.
 Pattiwatima – Knox (1789) in Am. St. Papers, Ind. Aff ., I, 8, 1832.
 Pa-tu-átami – Gatschet, Kaw MS. vocab., B. A. E., 27, 1878 (Kansa form).
 Pautawatimis – Doc. of 1712 quoted by Gale, Upper Miss., 61, 1867.
 Pautawattamies – Conf. of 1766 in N. Y Doc. Col. Hist., VII, 854, 1856.
 Pauteauamis – La Chauvignerie (1736) quoted by Schoolcraft, Ind. Tribes, III, 556, 1853.
 Pedadumies – Schoolcraft, ibid., V, 196, 1855.
 Peoutewatamie – Ft Harmar treaty (1789) in U. S. Ind. Treat., 27, 1837.
 Po-da-wand-um-ee – Schoolcraft, Ind. Tribes, II, 139, 1852.
 Po-da-waud-umeeg – Warren (1852) in Minn. Hist. Soc. Coll., V, 32, 1885.
 Ponkeontamis – Morse, N., Am., 256, 1776 (misprint).
 Ponteatamies – Gage (1764) in N. Y. Doc. Col. Hist., VII, 656, 1856.
 Ponteòtamies – Bouquet (1764) quoted by Jefferson, Notes, 143, 1825.
 Pontewatamis – Lattré, map, 1784.
 Pontowattimies – Carver, Trav., 19, 1778.
 Poodawahduhme – Jones, Ojebway Inds., 180, 1861.
 Potavalamia – Tonti, Rel.de la Le., 100, 1720.
 Potawahduhmee – Jones, Ojebway Inds., 178, 1861.
 Potawatama – Perkins and Peck, Annals of the West, 295, 1850.
 Potawatamies – Ind. Aff. Rep., 144, 1827.
 Potawatamis – Johnson (1765) in N. Y . Doc. Col. Hist., VII, 711, 1856.
 Potawatimie – Spring Wells treaty (1815) in U. S. Ind. Treat., 173, 1837.
 Po2-ta4-w`a3-to1/-me1 – Long, Exped. St Peter's R., I, 91, 1824 (own name).
 Potawatomis – Ibid., 81.
 Potawattamies – Wilkinson (1791) quoted by Rupp, W. Penn., app., 236, 1846.
 Potawattimie – Treaty of Tippecanoe (1836) in U. S. Ind. Treat.,. 709, 1873.
 Potawattomies – Tanner, Narr., 245, 1830.
 Potawatumies – Warren (1852) in Minn. Hist. Soc. Coll., V, 124, 1885.
 Pŏ-tă-waw-tō/-mē – Dunn, True Indian Stories, 299, 1908 (given as Keating's pronunciation).
 Pō-tă-wŏt-mē – Ibid. (given as a Potawatomi pronunciation).
 Potawtumies – Lindesay (1749) in N. Y. Doc. Col. Hist., VI, 538, 1855.
 Poteotamis – Montcalm (1757), ibid., X, 553, 1858.
 Potéoüatami – Jesuit Relations: for 1671, 25, 1858.
 Poteouatamis – Vater, Mith., pt, 3, sec. 3, 351, 1816.
 Potewatamies – Gallatin in Trans. Am. Ethnol., Soc., II, civ, 1846.
 Potewatamik – Gatschet, Ojibwa MS., B. A. E., 1882 (Chippewa name).
 Potiwattimeeg – Tanner, Narr., 315, 1830 (Ottawa name).
 Potiwattomies – Ibid.
 Potowatameh – Du Ponceau in Mass. Hist. Soc. Coll., 2d S.,IX, XV, 1822.
 Potowatamies – Croghan (1765) in N. Y. Doc. Col. Hist., VII, 784, 1856.
 Potowatomies – Trader (1778) quoted by Schoolcraft, Ind.Tribes, III, 561, 1853.
 Potowotamies – Gallatin in Trans. Am. Antiq. Soc., II, 121, 1836.
 Pottawatameh – Barton, New Views, xxxiiii, 1797.
 Pottawatamie – 1821 Treaty of Chicago in U. S. Ind. Treat., 152, 1873.
 Pottawataneys – Hopkins (1766) in N. Y. Doc. Col. Hist., VII, 993, 1856.
 Pottawatimies – Treaty (1806) in U S. Ind. Treat., 371, 1873.
 Pottawatomies – De Smet, Letters, 26, 1843..
 Pottawattamies – Brown, W. Gaz., 348, 1817.
 Potta-wat-um-ies – Warren (1852) in Minn. Hist. Soc. Coll., V, 81, 1885.
 Pottawaudumies – Ibid., 218.
 Pottawotamies – Shea, Cath. Miss., 397, 1855.
 Pottawottomies – Brownstown treaty (1809) in U. S. Ind. Treat., 194, 1873.
 Pottewatemies – Hildreth, Pioneer Hist., 75, 1848.
 Pottiwattamies – Harris, Tour, 195, 1805.
 Pottowatamies – Rupp, W. Penn., 345, 1846.
 Pottowatomy – Smith (1799) quoted by Drake, Trag. Wild., 221, 1841.
 Pottowattomies – Flint, Ind. Wars, 89, 1833.
 Pottowautomie – Council Bluffs treaty (1846) in U. S. Ind. Treat., 182, 1873.
 Pottowotomees – Treaty (1836), ibid., 150, 1873.
 Poulteattemis – Prise de Possession (1671) in Margry, Déc., I, 97, 1875.
 Poulx teattemis – Prise de Possession (1671) in N. Y,. Doc. Col. Hist., IX, 803,1855.
 Poutauatemis – Vaudreuil (1712) in N. Y. Doc. Col. Hist., IX, 863, 1855.
 Poutawatamies – Johnson (1772), ibid., VIII, 292, 1857.
 Poutawottamies – Imlay, W. Ter., 372, 1793.
 Pouteȣatamis – Doc. of 1695, ibid., 619.
 Poüteaoüatami – Allouez (1677) quoted by Shea, Discov. Miss. Val., 71, 1852.
 Pouteatami – Jesuit Relations: 1642, 97, 1858.
 Pouteatimies – Lamberville (1682) in N.Y. Doc. Col. Hist., IX, 192, 1855.
 Pouteauatamis – Doc. of 1748, ibid., X, 150, 1858.
 Pouteotamis – Harris, Voy. and Trav., II, 919, 1705.
 Pouteoüatami – Jesuit Relations: for 1667, 18, 1858.
 Pouteouatamiouec – Jesuit Relations: for 1667, 18, 1858.
 Pouteouatamis – La Chauvignerie (1736) in N. Y. Doc. Col. Hist., IX, 1058, 1855.
 Pouteouatimi – Doc. of 1748, ibid., X, 171, 1858.
 Pouteouetamites – Gallinèe (1661) in Margry, Déc., I, 144,1875.
 Pouteouitamis – La Galissonière (1748) in N. Y. Doc. Col. Hist., X, 182, 1858.
 Pouteouotamis – Coxe, Carolana, 19, 1741.
 Poutewatamies – Doc. of 1746 in N. Y. Doc. Col. Hist., X, 34, 1858.
 Poutoualamis – Tonti, Rel. De la Le., 100, 1720.
 Poutoüamis – Writer of 1756 in N.Y. Doc. Col. Hist., X, 401, 1858.
 Poutouatamis – Du Chesneau (1681) IX, 161, 1855.
 Poutouatamittes – Gallinèe (1669) in Margry, Déc., I, 142, 1875.
 Poutouotamis – Coxe, Carolana, map, 1741.
 Poutouwatamis – Le Sueur (1700) quoted by Neill, Minn., 156, 1858.
 Poutowatomies – Pike, Trav., 18, note, 1811.
 Poutuatamis – Le Sueur (1700) quoted by Shea, Early Voy., 94, 1861.
 Poutwatamis – Duquesne (1754) in N. Y. Doc. Col. Hist., X, 263, 1858.
 Pouutouatami – Jesuit Relations: 1640, 35, 1858.
 Powtawatamis – Trader of 1766 quoted by Schoolcraft, Ind. Tribes, III, 556, 1856.
 Powtewatamis – Jefferys, Fr. Doms., pt. 1, 144, 1761.
 Powtewattimies – Council of 1786 in Am. St. Papers, Ind. Aff., I, 8, 1832.
 Powtowottamies – Carver, Trav., 349, 1778.
 Puotwatemi – York (1700) in N. Y. Doc. Col. Hist., IV, 749, 1854.
 Putavatimes – Croghan (1759) quoted by Rupp, W. Penn., app., 138, 1846.
 Putawatame – Ft Wayne treaty (1810) in U. S. Ind. Tread., 374, 1873.
 Putawatimes – Croghan (1759) quoted by Proud, Penn., II, 296, 1798.
 Putawatimies – Treaty of 1806 in U. S. Ind. Treat., 373, 1873.
 Putawatimis – Treaty of 1806 in U. S. Ind. Treat., 373, 1873.
 Putawatomie – Brown, W. Gaz., 45, 1817.
 Putawawtawmaws – Dalton (1783) in Mass. Hist. Soc. Coll., 1st S., X, 123, 1809.
 Pú-te-wa-ta – Riggs, Dak. Gram. and Dict., 184, 1852 (Sioux form).
 Pú-te-wa-ta-dan – Ibid. (Santee form).
 Putewatimes – Croghan (1759) quoted by Rupp, W. Penn., app., 132, 1846.
 Putowatomey's – Croghan (1760) in Mass. Hist. Soc. Coll., 4th s., IX, 289, 1871.
 Puttawattimies – Grouseland treaty (1803) in U. S. Ind. Treat., 370, 1873.
 Puttcotungs – Beatty, Jour., 63, 1798 (misprint).
 Puttewatamies – Croghan (1765) in N.Y. Doc. Col. Hist., VII, 781, 1856.
 Puttowatamies – Bouquet (1760) in Mass. Hist. Soc. Coll., 4th S., IX, 295, 1871:
 Puttwatimees – Croghan (1760), ibid., 262.

Exonyms

Fire Nation
This is a loose translation of Bodéwadmi.
 Fire Nation – Schoolcraft, ibid., 206.
 Gens de Feu – Champlain (1616) Oeuvres, IV, 58, 1870; Sagard, Grande Voyage, I, 53, 1865.
 Gens feu – Sagard, Hist. Can., I, 194, 1836 (misprint).
 Nation du Feu – Jesuit Relations: 1641, 72, 1858.
 Nation of Fire – Jefferys, French Doms., pt. I, 48, 1761.

Lice Nation
This is a shortening of Bodéwadmi, which happens to be a homophone to the French word for "lice" (poux).
 Poes – Long, Voy. and Trav., 144. 1791.
 Pō-tŏsh – Dunn, True Indian Stories, 299, 1908 (Miami nickname).
 Pouës – Cadillac (1695) in Margry, Déc., V, 120, 1883 (abbreviated form used by French).
 Poulx – Montreal conf. (1756) in N. Y. Doc. Col. Hist., X, 447, 1858.
 Pous – Dunn, True Ind. Stories, 299, 1908 ('lice': French name, of accidental meaning; see Poux, Pouz).
 Poux – Frontenac (1682) in N. Y. Doc. Col. Hist., IX, 182, 1855.
 Pouz – Doc. Of 1748, ibid., X, 142, 1858.

Hybridized name
These name come from hybridization of Bodéwadmi with the French poux.
 Poueatamis – Boisherbert (1747) in N. Y. Doc. Col. Hist., X, 84, 1858.
 Pouhatamies – Boudinot, Star in the West, 128, 1816.
 Poutéamis – Lamberville (1682) in N. Y. Doc. Col. Hist., IX, 798, 1855.

Iroquoian names 
 Adawadenys – Canajoharie conf. (1759) in N. Y. Doc. Col. Hist. VII, 884, 1856 (probably an Iroquois corruption).
 Asistagueronon – Champlain (1616), Œuvres, V, pt. 1, 275, 1870.
 Asistagueroüon – Ibid. (1616), IV, 58, 1870.
 Assestagueronons – Schoolcraft. Ind. Tribes, IV, 206, 1854.
 Assistaeronons – Jesuit Relations: 1670-71, as quoted by Schoolcraft, ibid., 244.
 Assistagueronon – Sagard (1636), Hist. Can., I, 194,1864; Champlain (1632), Oeuvres, V, map, 1870.
 Assistaqueronons – Champlain, (ca. 1630), as quoted by Schoolcraft, Ind. Tribes, IV, 244, 1854.
 Athistaëronnon – Jesuit Relations: 1646, 77, 1858.
 Atowateany – Post (1758) quoted by Proud, Penn., II, app., 113, 1798.
 Atsistaehronons – Jesuit Relations: 1641, 72, 1858.
 Atsistahereoron – Champlain, Œuvres, IV, 58, note, 1870.
 Atsistarhonon – Sagard (1632), Hist. Can., Huron Dict., 1866 (Huron name).
 Attisitaehronon – Jesuit Relations: 1640, 35, 1858.
 Attistae – Schoolcraft, Ind. Tribes, IV, 244, 1854 (misquoted from Jesuit Relations: 1640, 35, 1855).
 Attistaeronons – Jesuit Relations: 1640 quoted by Schoolcraft, Ind. Tribes, IV, 244, 1854.
 Ndatonȣatendi – Potier, Racines Huron, MS., 1751 (Huron name); in Swanton
 Ndatonsatendi (?) – Potier, Racines Huron, MS., 1751 (Huron name); in Hodge
 Ondatouataudy – Jesuit Relations: 1648, 62, 1858.
 Undatomátendi – Gatschet, Wyandot MS., B. A. E., 1881 (Wyandot name).

Other names 
 Kúnu-hayánu – Gatschet, Caddo MS., B. A. E., 1884 ('watermelon people,' from kúnu, 'watermelon': Caddo name).
 Kúnu-háyanu, Caddo name, meaning "watermelon people"; in Swanton
 Peki /neni – Gatschet, Fox MS. vocab., B. A. E., 1882 (Fox name; plural Pekineni´/hak, 'grouse people,' from peki, 'grouse').
 Tcåshtålálgi – Creek name, meaning "watermelon people"; in Swanton
 Tchĕshtalálgi – Gatschet, Koassati MS., B. A. E.,1885 ('watermelon people,' from Creek tchĕstali, 'watermelons': Koassati name adopted from the Creeks).
 Wa3-h`o1-na2-ha2 – Long, Exped. St Peter's R., I, 92, 1824 ('fire-makers': Miami name).
 Wah-hō'-na-hah – Dunn, True Ind. Stories 299, 1908 (Miami name)., supposedly meaning "fire makers."
 Wáhiú¢axá – Omaha name, in Swanton.
 Wáhiú¢aqá – Dorsey in Cont. N. A. Ethnol., VI, pt. 2, 664; 1890 (Omaha name).
 Wáhiúyaha – Dorsey, Kansas MS.vocab., B.A. E., 1882 (Kansa name).
 Wapoos – La Salle (1680) quoted by Parkman, La Salle, 180, 1883 (identical?).
 Wo-rá-qĕ – St Cyr, inf'n, 1886 (Winnebago name).
 Woraqa – Dorsey, Tciwere MS., vocab., B. A. E., 1879 (Iowa, Oto, and Missouri name).
 Woraxa – Iowa, Oto, and Missouri name, in Swanton.
 Woráxe – Winnebago name, in Swanton

See also
 Algonquin ethnonyms
 Nipissing ethnonyms
 Ojibwa ethnonyms

Notes

References
 Hodge, Frederick Webb, ed.  "Potawatomi" Handbook of American Indians North of Mexico. (Smithsonian Institution, Bureau of American Ethnology Bulletin 30. GPO: 1910.)
 Kubiak, William J.; Great Lakes Indians; A Pictorial Guide;  Baker Book House Company, 1970
 Swanton, John R. "Michigan" The Indian Tribes of North America. (Smithsonian Institution, Bureau of American Ethnology Bulletin 145. GPO: 1935.)

 
Anishinaabe culture
Potawatomi